Oluwasegun Makinde (born 6 July 1991) is a Nigeria-born Canadian athlete competing in sprinting events.

Born in Maiduguri, Nigeria, Makinde moved with his family to Canada in 1992. He was an unused relay member at the 2012 Summer Olympics in London. He won the gold medal in the 200 metres at the 2013 Jeux de la Francophonie. In July 2016, he was named to Canada's Olympic team. He went to the 2018 Commonwealth Games with the Canadian team.

As of 2019, he was on the board of Athletics Canada.

Competition record

Personal best
100 metres – 10.24 (+1.4) (Toronto CAN, 11 June 2016)
200 metres – 20.51 (+1.7) (Lynchburg USA, 1 May 2014)

References

1991 births
Living people
Nigerian emigrants to Canada
Canadian male sprinters
Black Canadian track and field athletes
Athletes (track and field) at the 2018 Commonwealth Games
Commonwealth Games competitors for Canada
Athletes from Ottawa
Competitors at the 2011 Summer Universiade
Competitors at the 2013 Summer Universiade
Competitors at the 2017 Summer Universiade